IHQ may refer to:

 International Headquarters (disambiguation)
 iHQ (company)